Denis Dupays is a French choir conductor from Toulouse, specialized in the direction of .

After singing among the "Petits Chanteurs à la croix potencée", maîtrise de la Cathédrale Saint-Étienne de Toulouse, he pursued musical studies before taking over the direction of this same mastership.

He founded the "Capella Antiqua" in Toulouse before taking up the position of choir conductor at the Angers-Nantes Opéra. In 1989, he was appointed musical director and choir conductor of the Maîtrise de Radio France, a position which he relinquished in 1998 to Toni Ramon. From October 2001 to September 2008, he conducted the boys' choir of the Petits Chanteurs de Nogent-sur-Marne (Les Moineaux du Val-de-Marne).

References

External links 
 Denis Dupays on IdRef
 Denis Dupays on Bibliothèque Nationale de France
 Denis Dupays on Discogs
 Musique on La Croix (22 February 1996)
 Denis Dupays on BBC Music
 Denis Dupays on AllMusic

French choral conductors
French male conductors (music)
Musicians from Toulouse
Living people
Year of birth missing (living people)
21st-century French conductors (music)
21st-century French male musicians